St Mary is the parish church of Melton Mowbray, Leicestershire. The large medieval church, described as "one of the finest parish churches in Leicestershire", suffered from a poor Victorian restoration, and was left in a poor state of repair and deemed "unfit for purpose". By late 2017, work was completed to make the church more accessible and safe, which included a new floor and underfloor heating, a lighting and sound system and a rebuild of the historic organ; the reordering cost an approximate £2 million.

Features

St Mary's Church is the largest and "stateliest" parish church in Leicestershire, with visible remains dating mainly from the 13th-15th centuries.  The stonework in the lowest section of the tower, which has Norman windows, dates from 1170, although there were certainly one or more Anglo-Saxon churches on this site before the Norman one. It is built on a plan more usual for cathedrals and the  tower dominates the town, and is a rare example of a parish church with aisled transepts (one of only five in the country) a feature usually found only in a cathedral. It contains a number of notable monuments including the tomb of Roger de Mowbray, 1st Baron Mowbray and others dating from the 14th to the 18th century; also a memorial tablet to equine artist John Ferneley (1782 to 1860).

The church has a large choir containing around 40 members. It forms part of the Framland church trail along with 14 other churches in the 'Framland area'. Copies of the guide to the church trail are available from Melton Tourist Information Centre.

Bells and carillon

The belfry contains ten bells. The earliest bell (No.6) is by John of York dating from the fourteenth century. Most of the rest have been recast. Until 1802 there were only six bells: then two more were added and in 1894 a further two made the total ten. In addition there is a small sanctus bell which dates from the seventeenth century.

The carillon on which the chimes are played three times a day were restored in 1938 through a bequest by Alice Henton. This restoration involved a new clock to replace the previous one dating from the early nineteenth century.

List of rectors

1562 Miles Bennes
1578 Edward Turner
1599–1613 Isaac Cooper
1613–1659† Zachary Cawdray
1660–1690† John Dowell
1690–1731† Simon Henley
1731–1740† John Hardy
1740–1741† Foulk Myddelton
1741–1773† Thomas Myddelton
1773–1820 Thomas Ford
1820–1832† Thomas Godfrey
1832–1839 John Savile Hallifax
1839–1866† Robert Fleetwood Croughton
1866–1889† William Morris Colles (father of William Morris Colles)
1889–1891 Gilbert Karney
1891–1924 Canon Richard Blakeney (son of Richard Paul Blakeney)
1924–1928 John Llewellyn Davies
1928–1937 Canon Percy Robson
1937 Canon Harold R. Bates
1946 Canon Charles Maurice Strettell Clark
1965 Canon George Herbert Codrington
1981 Canon Donald Edward Boughton Law
1989 Donald Henry Thorpe
1994–2009 Canon Charles Jenkin (son of Lord Jenkin)
2009– Kevin Ashby

† Rector died in post

Organ

A new organ was installed by John Gray of London was opened on 30 September 1832. It was built in the fashion of two Gothic towers and was intended to stand at the west end of the church allowing a view of the window in the middle. It was enlarged by Groves and Mitchell in 1849 to comprise 27 stops over two manuals and pedals and re-opened on 13 January 1850. In this new incarnation it was moved to a position either side of the chancel. The organ was enlarged again in 1897 by William Hill and Son to become a 3 manual and pedal instrument of 39 stops. In 1929–30, Haydn Morton overhauled the instrument, inserted pneumatic action to the pedal board, and made layout modifications to assist with tuning and maintenance. The console was moved into the north transept. This  was rebuilt by J. W. Walker & Sons Ltd in 1955. A specification of the organ can be found on the National Pipe Organ Register. In 2018, Henry Groves & Son completed a rebuild and re-ordering of the 3-manual Hill/Walker organ, including addition of pedal 32ft Contra Trombone and a 5-rank Great Cornet, 69 stops.

List of organists

Taken from handwritten list in the church on the organ console:

Thomas Hickson 1846 - 1880
Claude Ferneley 1880 - 1890
L. Camidge 1890 - 1900
Percy Jones 1900 - 1914
Malcolm Sargent 1914 - 1924
William Hunt 1925 - 1928
Percy George Saunders 1928 - 1930 later organist of Wakefield Cathedral
William Dean Pearson 1930 - 1937 - 1940
Lt. Col. Skentelbury 1941
Cecil Clarke 1942 - 1946
Harold L. Barnes 1946 - 1966
John A. Bellamy 1966 - 1968
Eric Bennett 1968 - 1973
Michael Bryan Hesford 1973 - 1978
Ian Major 1978 - 1982
Robert Kalton 1982 - 1987
Douglas Hollick 1987 - 1988
John Wilks 1988 - 1991
John Clark 1991 - 1998
Anne de Graeve 1998 - 2002
Keith Morgan 2002-2005
James Gutteridge 2005 - current

References

 Thompson, Charles Henry (1950). The Story of St Mary's Church Melton Mowbray. Gloucester : British Publishing Co.



Melton Mowbray
Church of England church buildings in Leicestershire
Grade I listed churches in Leicestershire